This is a list of postmodern literary critics.



A
Gloria E. Anzaldúa
Paul Auster

B
Roland Barthes
Subimal Basak
Jean Baudrillard
Michael Bérubé
Homi K. Bhabha
Maurice Blanchot
Jay David Bolter
Jorge Luis Borges
Pierre Bourdieu
Judith Butler

C
 Alex Callinicos
 Chantal Chawaf
Malay Roy Choudhury
 Hélène Cixous
 Robert Coover

D
Guy Debord
Gilles Deleuze
Jacques Derrida

E
Terry Eagleton
Umberto Eco

F
Stanley Fish
Michel Foucault

G
Marjorie Garber
Gerard Genette
Sandra Gilbert
Félix Guattari
Susan Gubar

H
Donna Haraway
Ihab Hassan
N. Katherine Hayles
Stephen Hicks
bell hooks
Linda Hutcheon - Historiographical metafiction

I
 Luce Irigaray

J
Fredric Jameson
Keith Jenkins
Michael Joyce

K
Friedrich Kittler
Julia Kristeva

L
Jacques Lacan
George Landow
Jean-François Lyotard

M
Lev Manovich
Gabriel Garcia Marquez
Larry McCaffery
Brian McHale
Trinh T. Minh-ha
Toni Morrison
Stuart Moulthrop
Haruki Murakami

P
Camille Paglia
Thomas Pynchon

R
Bryan Reynolds
Richard Rorty
Samir Roychoudhury

S
Ernesto Sabato
Edward Said
Eve Kosofsky Sedgwick
Gayatri Chakravorty Spivak
Allucquere Rosanne Stone (Sandy Stone)

V
Gianni Vattimo

W
David Foster Wallace
Patricia Waugh
Ken Wilber
Monique Wittig

Z
Ravi Zacharias
Slavoj Žižek

See also
Early critics important to postmodernism:
Søren Kierkegaard
Claude Lévi-Strauss
Friedrich Nietzsche
Ferdinand de Saussure

General:
Cultural studies
Gender studies
Hungryalism
List of postmodern novels
List of postmodern writers
Literary theory
Post-colonialism
Poststructuralism
Postmodern literature
Second-wave feminism
Third-wave feminism

References
Leitch, Vincent B. The Norton Anthology of Theory and Criticism.  New York: London, 2001 .

Literature lists
Critics
Literary criticism
Critical theory
 
 Critics